Jimmie Corns is a former American football coach. He was the head football coach at Bethel College in North Newton, Kansas for five seasons, from 1972 to 1976, compiling a record of 18–28.

Corns coached at Hiawatha High School in Hiawatha, Kansas and then was the head football coach at Highland Community College in Highland, Kansas for one season, in 1971, leading his team to a record of 1–8.
 Corns resigned from his post at Bethel in December 1976 to enter private business.

Head coaching record

College

Notes

References

Year of birth missing (living people)
Living people
American football guards
Bethel Threshers football coaches
College of Emporia Fighting Presbies football players
High school football coaches in Kansas
Junior college football coaches in the United States